

Richard Müller (4 November 1891 – 16 July 1943) was a general in the Wehrmacht of Nazi Germany during World War II. He was a recipient of the Knight's Cross of the Iron Cross. Müller was killed on 16 July 1943 northeast of Orel, during the Battle of Kursk.

Awards and decorations

 Knight's Cross of the Iron Cross on 7 March 1943 as Generalleutnant and commander of 211. Infanterie-Division

References

Citations

Bibliography

 

1891 births
1943 deaths
Lieutenant generals of the German Army (Wehrmacht)
German Army personnel of World War I
Prussian Army personnel
German Army personnel killed in World War II
Recipients of the clasp to the Iron Cross, 1st class
Recipients of the Knight's Cross of the Iron Cross
People from Allstedt
People from the Province of Saxony
Reichswehr personnel
Military personnel from Saxony-Anhalt
German Army generals of World War II